The Vanderbilt rape case is a criminal case of sexual assault that occurred on June 23, 2013, in Nashville, Tennessee, in which four Vanderbilt University football players carried an unconscious 21-year-old female student into a dorm room, gang-raped and sodomized her, photographed and videotaped her, and one urinated on her face.

Three of the rapists were convicted, and received prison sentences ranging from 15 years, the minimum allowed by Tennessee law for their crimes, to 17 years. The fourth player accepted a plea deal which included 10 years' probation, and did not receive any jail time.

Rape
On June 23, 2013, four Vanderbilt Commodores football team players, Brandon Vandenburg, Cory Lamont Batey, Brandon E. Banks, and Jaborian "Tip" McKenzie carried an unconscious 21-year-old female student into a dorm room in the school's Gilette House dorm. They gang-raped and sodomized her, slapped her, inserted their fingers in her, and sat on her face as she was on the floor in a 32-minute attack. They took over 40 graphic photos, and took videos of the rape with the cell phones of Vandenburg, Batey, and Banks. The victim (who is white) told the court that after Batey (who is black) raped her, he urinated on her face while saying she deserved what he was doing to her because of the color of her skin, saying what sources reported was "That’s for 400 years of slavery, you bitch."

Case
The four defendants documented their gang rape with both videos and pictures and tried to delete it. When the footage was recovered from their cellular devices, it was presented in court, as well as security camera footage that caught their act.

The players were dismissed from the football team on June 29, 2013, and banned from campus during the six-week investigation that followed.  On August 9, 2013, they were arrested and indicted for aggravated rape and sexual battery. All four men were charged with five counts of aggravated rape and two counts of aggravated sexual battery.

In July 2016, after being convicted by a Davidson County Criminal Court jury, Batey, 22 years old, received a 15-year prison sentence, the minimum allowed by law for his crimes (while both the victim and prosecutors had asked the judge for the maximum sentence possible of 25 years to be meted out); after he gets out he will be required to be listed on the sex-offender registry for the rest of his life. He is serving his time in Riverbend Maximum Security Institution.

In November 2016, after being convicted, Vandenburg was sentenced to 17 years in prison; after he gets out he will be required to be listed on the sex-offender registry for the rest of his life. He is serving his time in Morgan County Correctional Complex.

In August 2017, after being convicted, Banks received a 15-year sentence; after he gets out he will be required to be listed on the sex-offender registry for the rest of his life. He is serving his time in Turney Center Industrial Complex.

In March 2018, after testifying against his three co-defendants and pleading guilty to facilitation of aggravated rape, McKenzie, 23 years old, accepted a plea deal which included 10 years' probation and a lifetime registration as a sex offender, and became the only of the four defendants to not receive any jail time. He was not seen touching the victim after he helped his teammates carry her into the dorm room.

A fifth player, Chris Boyd, pleaded guilty in September 2013 to being an accessory after the fact by encouraging his teammates to keep quiet and destroy evidence of the rape, and was dismissed from the team but not the university for his role in helping cover up the rape. He testified against Vandenberg and Batey as part of a plea deal, and was sentenced to a year of unsupervised probation.

Mack Prioleau, the roommate of one of the defendants, Vandenburg, was in the room when the rape occurred. "I was scared and uncomfortable and didn't know what to do," Prioleau said during his 2015 testimony. Prioleau urged his friends to delete all the evidence that could be used against them and even helped clean the room in an attempt to remove anything that could have been traced back to the victim, like the victim's vomit. Prioleau was charged as an accessory to the crime and received one year of unsupervised probation.

Appeals by Batey, Vandenburg, and Banks to the Tennessee Court of Criminal Appeals in efforts to have their convictions overturned were unsuccessful in 2019. In 2020, the Tennessee Supreme Court declined to reconsider Vandenburg's appeal of his conviction.

See also
Baylor University sexual assault scandal
Sexual assault of Savannah Dietrich
Steubenville High School rape case
Campus sexual assault

References

External links
"Police Find Video of Victim's Rape by Vanderbilt Football Players," ABC News, January 31, 2015 (video).
"Video Shows Vanderbilt Football Player Carrying Date Into Dorm," ABC News, June 27, 2015 (video).

2013 in Tennessee
Campus sexual assault
College football controversies
Rape in the United States
Rape trials in the United States
Sex crime trials
Gang rape in the United States
Nashville, Tennessee
Violence in Tennessee
June 2013 crimes in the United States
Crimes in Tennessee
Vanderbilt University
Vanderbilt Commodores football
Women in Tennessee
Sexual assault in sports